Nango may refer to:

Places in Japan 
Nangō, Aomori, a former village in Aomori Prefecture
Nangō, Fukushima, a former village in Fukushima Prefecture
Nangō, Miyagi, a former town in Miyagi Prefecture
Nangō, Miyazaki (Higashiusuki), a former village in Higashiusuki District, Miyazaki Prefecture
Nangō, Miyazaki (Minaminaka), a former town in Minaminaka District, Miyazaki Prefecture

Other uses 
 Nango, a subgroup of the Yolngu people of Australia
 Nango, an island off the coast of Kavieng, New Ireland, Papua New Guinea

See also 
 Nanggu language, an Austronesian language of the Solomon Islands